Frédéric Ebong-Salle, better known as Fred Salle (born 10 September 1964) is a male retired athlete who specialized in the long jump.

Great Britain and England
He represented Great Britain for most of his career, except for a period in the late 1980s and early 1990s when he represented Cameroon. His personal best jump of 8.10 metres was achieved at the 1994 IAAF World Cup, which he won; he also won the silver medal at the 1986 Commonwealth Games in Edinburgh, Scotland, representing England.

Cameroon
Starting in the 1986–87 indoor season, Salle opted to represent Cameroon. His best jump while representing England had been 2.13 metres, achieved in May 1985 in Cambridge, Massachusetts.

Salle competed internationally for his new country, starting at the 1987 World Championships, though he did not reach the final round. At the 1987 Central African Games, he won the gold medals in both long and high jump, and at the 1988 African Championships, he won the silver medal in the long jump—behind Yusuf Alli—and the bronze medal in the high jump. He then competed at the 1988 Olympic Games, but 7.65 metres in the qualifying round was not enough to reach the final. At the 1989 World Indoor Championships he only managed 7.31 metres, ending in last place of the qualifying round. At the 1991 World Indoor Championships, he ended third to last with 7.11 metres. He won a silver medal as a guest competitor at the AAA Indoor Championships of 1990.

Back to England
By 1992 he returned to representing Great Britain in competitions. He competed at the World Championships in 1993 and 1995 as well as the 1995 World Indoor Championships without reaching the final. However, he won the 1994 IAAF World Cup competition in London with a jump of 8.10 metres. This was Salle's personal best jump. He did have one wind-assisted 8.10 result in the same year, achieved in July in Gateshead. He represented England, at the 1994 Commonwealth Games in Victoria, British Columbia, Canada.

In domestic competitions, he won several medals. At the UK Championships, he won a bronze medal in 1992 and a silver in 1993. At the AAA Championships, he won gold medals in 1993 and 1995 and a silver in 1994. At the AAA Championships, he won the bronze medal in 1993, behind two Swedish guests.

The Present
After working at many different ICT firms, Fred Salle had turned his passion to teaching, inspiring many young people to achieve through telling them of his own experiences.

References

1964 births
Living people
English male long jumpers
Athletes (track and field) at the 1986 Commonwealth Games
Athletes (track and field) at the 1994 Commonwealth Games
Commonwealth Games silver medallists for England
Commonwealth Games medallists in athletics
Cameroonian male long jumpers
World Athletics Championships athletes for Cameroon
Athletes (track and field) at the 1988 Summer Olympics
Olympic athletes of Cameroon
Medallists at the 1986 Commonwealth Games